In combinatorial mathematics, a picture is a bijection between skew diagrams satisfying certain properties, introduced by  in a generalization of the Robinson–Schensted correspondence and the Littlewood–Richardson rule.

References

Algebraic combinatorics
Combinatorial algorithms